Sir Roderick Norman McIver MacSween  (2 February 1935 – 11 December 2015) was a Scottish pathologist, professor of pathology at University of Glasgow, 1984 to 1999.

MacSween was a past President of the Royal College of Pathologists (1996–99), a member of the General Medical Council (1998-2001) and was knighted for services to medicine and to pathology in 2000.

He was a chairman of Tenovus Scotland, which annually award the Sir Roddy MacSween prize and medal to a medical student of the University of Glasgow for outstanding performance in pathology.

He also chaired investigations into diseases affecting farmed fish. His Pathology of the liver has reached its 7th edition and is also an ebook.

References

Sources
 MacSWEEN, Sir Roderick (Norman McIver), Who's Who 2012, A & C Black, 2012; online edn, Oxford University Press, December 2011; online edn, Nov 2011         accessed 22 February 2012

1935 births
2015 deaths
Scottish pathologists
Academics of the University of Glasgow
Fellows of the Royal College of Physicians of Edinburgh
Fellows of the Royal College of Physicians and Surgeons of Glasgow
Fellows of the Royal College of Pathologists
Fellows of the Academy of Medical Sciences (United Kingdom)
Fellows of the Royal Society of Edinburgh
Knights Bachelor